This is a list of Hawaiian species extinct in the Holocene that covers extinctions from the Holocene epoch, a geologic epoch that began about 11,650 years before present (about 9700 BCE) and continues to the present day.

The Hawaiian Islands include the eight major islands (the Windward Islands) and the small islands and atolls of the Northwestern Hawaiian Islands. They are all part of the U.S. state of Hawaii, except Midway Atoll, which is a separate U.S. territory.

Hawaii was settled by Polynesians sometime between 1000 and 1200 CE. British explorer James Cook, the first known non-Polynesian to arrive at the archipelago, arrived in 1778. An influx of European and American explorers, traders, and whalers arrived shortly after. Hawaii was annexed by the United States in 1898 and became a state in 1959.

Numerous species have disappeared from Hawaii as part of the ongoing Holocene extinction, driven by human activity. Human contact, first by Polynesians and later by Europeans, had a significant impact on the environment. Both the Polynesians and Europeans cleared native forests and introduced non-indigenous species for agriculture (or by accident), driving many endemic species to extinction. Fossil finds in caves, lava tubes, and sand dunes have revealed that Hawaii once had a native eagle, two raven-size crows, several bird-eating owls, and giant ducks known as moa-nalo. Today, many of Hawaii's remaining endemic species of plants and animals are considered endangered. Hawaii has more endangered species and has lost a higher percentage of its endemic species than any other U.S. state. The endemic plant Brighamia now requires hand pollination because its natural pollinator is presumed to be extinct.

Many extinction dates are unknown due to a lack of relevant information.

This list only includes the indigenous biota of Hawaii, not domestic animals like the Hawaiian poi dog.

Mammals (class Mammalia)

Bats (order Chiroptera)

Vesper bats (family Vespertilionidae)

Birds (class Aves)

Waterfowl (order Anseriformes)

Ducks, geese, and swans (family Anatidae)

Rails and cranes (order Gruiformes)

Rails (family Rallidae)

Albatrosses and petrels (order Procellariiformes)

Petrels and shearwaters (family Procellariidae)

Pelicans, herons, and ibises (order Pelecaniformes)

Ibises and spoonbills (family Threskiornithidae)

Hawks and relatives (order Accipitriformes)

Hawks, eagles, kites, harriers and Old World vultures (family Accipitridae)

Owls (order Strigiformes)

True owls (family Strigidae)

Perching birds (order Passeriformes)

Crows and relatives (family Corvidae)

Extinct in the wild, crows and relatives (family Corvidae)

Reed warblers (family Acrocephalidae)

Hawaiian honeyeaters (family Mohoidae)

Thrushes (family Turdidae)

Possibly extinct, thrushes (family Turdidae)

True finches (family Fringillidae)

Possibly extinct, true finches (family Fringillidae)

Insects (class Insecta)

Dragonflies and damselflies (order Odonata)

Narrow-winged damselflies (family Coenagrionidae)

Possibly extinct

Grasshoppers, locusts, and crickets (order Orthoptera)

True crickets (family Gryllidae)

Extinct in the wild

True bugs (order Hemiptera)

Mealybugs (family Pseudococcidae)

Beetles (order Coleoptera)

True weevils (family Curculionidae)

Butterflies and moths (order Lepidoptera)

Pyralid moths (family Pyralidae)

Owlet moths (family Noctuidae)

Possibly extinct, owlet moths (family Noctuidae)

Data deficient, owlet moths (family Noctuidae)

Geometer moths (family Geometridae)

True flies (order Diptera)

Long-legged flies (family Dolichopodidae)

Fruit flies and relatives (family Drosophilidae)

Gastropods (class Gastropoda)

Order Stylommatophora

Family Achatinellidae

Family Amastridae

Family Pupillidae

See also 
 Endemism in the Hawaiian Islands
 List of endemic birds of Hawaii
 List of Oceanian animals extinct in the Holocene
 List of Australia-New Guinea species extinct in the Holocene
 List of New Zealand species extinct in the Holocene
 List of North American animals extinct in the Holocene
 List of extinct bird species since 1500
 Holocene extinction

Notes

References

 
Extinct
Hawaiian Islands
Extinct animals
Extinct